Jerónimo Ibáñez Escribano (born 14 June 1957) is a Spanish former professional racing cyclist. He rode in the 1985 Tour de France.

Major results
1981
 5th Overall Vuelta a Andalucía
 8th Overall Vuelta a Burgos
1982
 1st Overall Vuelta a Asturias
1st Stage 3
1983
 7th Overall Vuelta a Andalucía

Grand Tour general classification results timeline

References

External links
 

1957 births
Living people
Spanish male cyclists
Sportspeople from the Province of Albacete
Cyclists from Castilla-La Mancha